The County Borough of Warrington was, from 1900 to 1974, a local government district centred on Warrington in Lancashire, northwest England. It was alternatively known as Warrington County Borough and the County of Warrington.

The district was created in 1900 and was based upon the earlier Municipal Borough of Warrington, which had, in turn, been based on the older ancient borough of Warrington. This had received its charter in 1847. These earlier local government districts had crossed the county boundary line and contained small parts of parishes in Cheshire, namely, Latchford, Cheshire and Thelwall though these anomalies were rectified in 1894 and 1884, respectively.

The County Borough of Warrington was abolished by the Local Government Act 1972 and its territory, along with that of Warrington Rural District transferred to Cheshire to form part of the Borough of Warrington.

Notes and references

Notes

Bibliography

County borough
Districts of England abolished by the Local Government Act 1972
County boroughs of England
County borough